Train Advise Assist Command – North (TAAC – North) was a multinational military formation, part of NATO's Resolute Support Mission within Afghanistan. Until 2014 it was designated Regional Command North, under the International Security Assistance Force.

See also
 Train Advise Assist Command – Capital
 Train Advise Assist Command – East
 Train Advise Assist Command – South
 Train Advise Assist Command – West
 Train Advise Assist Command – Air

References

External links

Resolute Support Mission units and formations (Afghanistan)